Scott E. Penny is an American chief of police and a politician who served as a Democratic member of the Illinois House of Representatives from November 2011 until January 2013.

Background
Penny received his associate degree in law enforcement form Belleville Area College and his bachelor's degree in criminal justice from McKendree University. He served as an adjunct professor at Southwestern Illinois College. Penny served as police chief for Fairmont City, Illinois and was a business owner.

Illinois House of Representatives
In November 2011, Penny was appointed by local Democratic leaders to the Illinois House of Representatives to succeed Tom Holbrook who chose to resign and take chairmanship of the Illinois Pollution Control Board.

Penny served until January 2013

Post legislative career
On July 1, 2013, Governor Pat Quinn appointed Penny to the Southwest Regional Port District Board for a term expiring for a term expiring June 30, 2016. The Southwest Regional Port District Board governs the port district which includes townships of Canteen, Centreville, East St. Louis, Stites, and Sugar Loaf in St. Clair County, Illinois. Its specific responsibilities include maintenance terminal, and airport facilities and the promotion of industrial, commercial, and recreational development.

References

Year of birth missing (living people)
Living people
People from Fairmont City, Illinois
McKendree University alumni
Southwestern Illinois College alumni
Southwestern Illinois College faculty
American municipal police chiefs
Democratic Party members of the Illinois House of Representatives